The 1949 Kansas State Wildcats football team represented Kansas State University in the 1949 college football season. The team's head football coach was Ralph Graham in his second year. The Wildcats played their home games in Memorial Stadium. The Wildcats finished the season with a 2–8 record with a 1–5 record in conference play. They finished in last place in the Big Seven Conference.  The Wildcats scored 191 points and gave up 257 points. The win against Colorado on 10/1/1949 snapped a 22-game conference losing streak.

Harold Robinson played football for Kansas State with an athletic scholarship in 1949, breaking the decades-long "color barrier" in Big Seven conference athletics, and also becoming the first ever African-American athlete on scholarship in the conference.

Schedule

References

Kansas State
Kansas State Wildcats football seasons
Kansas State Wildcats football